Harry Threadgold (1924-1996) was a footballer who played as a goalkeeper in the Football League initially for Chester.

He also played for Sunderland and spent 10 years at Southend United from July 1953 until 1963. He retired in May 1963.

He was born on 6 November 1924 in Tattenhall, Cheshire and died in 1996, his ashes were scattered at Roots Hall, Southend United's ground.

References

1924 births
1996 deaths
People from Tattenhall
Association football goalkeepers
Chester City F.C. players
Sunderland A.F.C. players
Southend United F.C. players
English Football League players
English footballers